The Church of South India Order of Sisters is a Protestant religious congregation founded in India.  At every biennial Church of South India Synod, two sisters from the congregation are entitled to participate in the Synod.

References

 
Church of South India
Protestant orders and societies